Mueller is a spelling variant of the German surname Müller (miller). In German, the letter "ü" can be replaced with "ue". Notable people with this surname include:

Acting and filmmaking
Armin Mueller-Stahl (born 1930), German actor
Brooke Mueller (born 1977), American actress
Cookie Mueller (1949–1989), American actress
Heidi Mueller (born 1982), American actress
Jessie Mueller (born 1983), American actress and singer
Mauro Mueller, Swiss-Mexican narrative filmmaker
William A. Mueller (1901–1992), American sound engineer nominated for two Academy Awards

Government
Anne Mueller (1930–2000), British civil servant and academic
August B. Mueller (1905-1996), American politician and farmer in Minnesota
Fred A. Mueller (1868–?), American politician in Wisconsin
Frederick H. Mueller (1893–1976), United States Secretary of Commerce (1959–1961)
Jacob Mueller (1822–1905), German-born American politician in Ohio
James Mueller, American politician in Ohio
James Mueller (mayor), American politician in Indiana
Johannes Ferdinand Mueller (fl. 1906), Australian postmaster
Kimberly J. Mueller (born 1957), American judge in California
Mike Mueller (born 1974), American politician in Michigan
Otto Mueller (politician) (1875–1973), American politician in Wisconsin
Robert Mueller (born 1944), American lawyer, former Director of the FBI and author of the Mueller Report
Ursula Mueller, German foreign affairs figure
Walter H. Mueller (c. 1925–2011), American politician in Missouri

Journalism, writing, publishing
Andrew Mueller, Australian-born, London-based journalist and author
Gene Mueller (born 1942), American historian and author
Jen Mueller (born 1978), American television and radio sports broadcast journalist
Lisel Mueller (1924–2020), German-born American poet, translator, and teacher
Marnie Mueller, American novelist
Merrill Mueller (1916–1980), American journalist
P. S. Mueller, American cartoonist and voice actor
Pamela Bauer Mueller (born 1945), American author
Wolfgang Philipp Mueller (born 1966), German founder of VDM Publishing

Military
Greta Bösel (née Mueller) (1908–1947), German concentration camp guard executed for war crimes
Desmond Mueller (born 1943), Australian Army officer
Paul J. Mueller (1892–1962), United States Army officer

Music
Caleb Mueller, known as "Decomposure", Canadian electronic music mixer, graphic and visual artist
Christoph-Mathias Mueller (born 1967), Peru-born conductor in Germany and the United States
Gussie Mueller (1890–1965), American jazz clarinetist
Ivan Mueller (1786–1854), Russian clarinetist
Jeff Mueller, American math-rock vocalist and guitarist
Jon Mueller (born 1970), American drummer, percussionist, and composer
Karl Mueller (rock musician) (1963–2005), American rock musician
Mark Mueller, American songwriter
Siggi Mueller (born 1964), German film composer and musician
Otto-Werner Mueller (1926–2016), German-born conductor in the United States

Painters and artisans
Herman Carl Mueller (1854–1941), German-born ceramicist in the United States
Otto Mueller (1874–1930), German Expressionist painter
Stephen Mueller (1947–2011), American painter

Religion 
Gerhard Ludwig Müller (born 1947), German Cardinal

Science and education
Alfred Mueller (born 1939), American theoretical physicist
Brian Mueller, American academic and university administrator
Dennis Mueller, professor of economics at the University of Vienna
Eva Mueller (1920–2006), American professor of economics
Ferdinand von Mueller (1825–1896), German-Australian botanist
Fritz Mueller (1907–2001), German engineer who later emigrated to the United States
George Mueller (NASA) (1918–2015), American engineer who served as an associate administrator at NASA
Gerhard Mueller (engineer) (1835–1918), German-born New Zealand surveyor, engineer and land commissioner
Gustav Adolph Mueller (1864–1937), German-American architect, engineer, and sculptor
Gustav Emil Mueller (1898–1987), Swiss philosopher
Hans Mueller (physicist) (1900-1965), Swiss-American physicist, inventor of Mueller calculus
Jean Mueller (born 1950), American astronomer
Jennifer Mueller, American applied mathematician
John Mueller (born 1937), American political scientist
John Howard Mueller (1891–1954), American biochemist, pathologist, and bacteriologist
Kai-Markus Mueller (born 1976), German neuroscientist, entrepreneur, and professor
Kate Hevner Mueller (1898–1984), American educator
Steffen Mueller, American virologist and professor
Tom Mueller, American rocket engineer

Sports

Association football (soccer)
Chris Mueller (soccer) (born 1996), American soccer player
Danny Mueller (born 1966), American-born, Puerto Rico association football midfielder
Taylor Mueller (born 1988), American soccer player

Baseball
Bill Mueller (born 1971), American baseball infielder
Bill Mueller (outfielder) (1920–2001), American baseball player
Don Mueller (1927–2011), American baseball outfielder
Dorothy Mueller (1925–1985), American baseball player (All-American Girls Professional Baseball League)
Gordie Mueller (1922–2006), American baseball pitcher
Heinie Mueller (second baseman) (1912–1986), American baseball player
Heinie Mueller (outfielder) (1899–1975), American baseball player
Jon Mueller (baseball) (born 1970), American college baseball coach (Albany)
Les Mueller (1919–2012), American baseball pitcher
Ray Mueller (1912–1994), American baseball catcher
Walter Mueller (1894–1971), American baseball outfielder
Willie Mueller (born 1956), American baseball pitcher

Basketball
Earl Mueller (1903–1932), American basketball player
Erwin Mueller (1944–2018), American basketball player
Kit Mueller (born c. 1971), American basketball player
Tex Mueller (1916–2012), American basketball player

Gridiron football
Jamie Mueller (born 1964), American football player
Marc Mueller (born 1989), Canadian coach of gridiron football
Randy Mueller (born 1961), American football executive
Rick Mueller (born 1967), American football executive
Ryan Mueller (born 1991), American football player
Tom Mueller (American football) (born c. 1945), American football coach (Nebraska–Omaha)
Tom Mueller (American football, born 1946), American football coach (Texas Lutheran)
Vance Mueller (born 1964), American football player

Ice hockey
Chris Mueller (ice hockey) (born 1986), American ice hockey player
Greg Mueller (born 1971), Swiss-born former ice hockey player in Germany; professional poker player
Norbert Mueller (1906–1956), Canadian ice hockey player
Peter Mueller (ice hockey) (born 1988), American ice hockey player

Other
Alexandra Mueller (born 1988), American professional tennis player
Barbara Mueller (athlete) (born 1933), American track and field athlete
Blake Mueller (born 1982), Australian rugby league footballer
Brock Mueller (born 1978), Australian rugby league footballer
Eric Mueller (born 1970), American rower
Felice Mueller (born 1989), American rower
Federico Mueller (1888–?), Chilean middle-distance runner
Gunnar Mueller (born 1948), Swedish professional golfer
Gustav Mueller (gymnast) (fl. 1904), American gymnast
Jack Mueller (1915–2001), Australian rules footballer
Julio Mueller (1905–1984), Mexican polo player
Melissa Mueller (born 1972), American pole vaulter
Merv Mueller (1914–1984), Australian cricketer
Michelle Mueller (fl. 2012), Canadian equestrian
Peter Mueller (speed skater) (born 1954), American former speed skater and speed skating coach

Other fields
Barbara R. Mueller (1925–2016), American philatelist
Christoph Mueller (born 1961), German business executive in the aviation industry
Christopher Mueller (disambiguation), several people
Edward Mueller, American executive, former CEO and Chairman of Qwest Communications
Gordon H. Mueller (born 1940), American historian
Gustave A. Mueller (1863–1912), American homeopath and surgeon
Joseph Maximilian Mueller (1894–1981), American prelate of the Roman Catholic Church
Kayla Mueller (1988–2015), American human rights activist
Peter Mueller (disambiguation), several people
William Boyce Mueller (1942–1993), American scouting figure

See also
Müller (surname)

German-language surnames